Alum Rock Transit Center (or simply Alum Rock Station) is an at-grade intermodal transit center located at the intersection of South Capitol Avenue and Nuestra Castillo Court in the Alum Rock district of San Jose, California. The light rail station is located in the center median of South Capitol Avenue and is the current eastern terminus for the Orange Line of the VTA light rail system. VTA buses serve the transit center both on South Capitol Avenue and in a nearby bus plaza located adjacent to the light rail station.

The transit center is the transfer point between the Orange Line and VTA's Rapid bus rapid transit route which offers service south to the Eastridge Transit Center or west to Downtown San Jose, San Jose Diridon station, and the Palo Alto Transit Center.

Service

Station layout

See also 
Alum Rock, California

References

External links 

Alum Rock Transit Center park & ride lot info at VTA

Santa Clara Valley Transportation Authority light rail stations
Santa Clara Valley Transportation Authority bus stations
Railway stations in San Jose, California
Railway stations in the United States opened in 2004
2004 establishments in California